Cup of Nations may refer to:

 Football (soccer)
 Africa Cup of Nations, a men's international association football competition in Africa
 Afro-Asian Cup of Nations, a men's international association football competition played between the winners of the Asian Cup and African Cup of Nations
 Cup of Nations (Australia), a women's international football (soccer) tournament held by Football Australia

 Roller hockey
 Nations Cup (roller hockey), a roller hockey tournament hosted in Montreux since 1921

 Rugby
 2017 Cup of Nations (rugby union), an annual international rugby union tournament